Maple River may refer to:

Rivers 
Maple River (Iowa), a tributary of the Little Sioux River in the U.S. state of Iowa
Maple River (Michigan), any of three rivers in the U.S. state of Michigan
Maple River (Burt Lake)
Maple River (Grand River tributary)
Maple River (Muskegon River)
Maple River (Minnesota), a tributary of the Le Sueur River in the U.S. state of Minnesota
Maple River (North Dakota), a tributary of the Red River of the North in the U.S. state of North Dakota
Maple River (North Dakota–South Dakota), a tributary of the Elm River in the U.S. states of North Dakota and South Dakota

Places 
 Maple River, Iowa, an unincorporated community
 Maple River State Game Area, a wildlife area in the U.S. state of Michigan
 Maple River Township (disambiguation)

See also 
 Maple (disambiguation)